St John's CE Middle Academy -- formerly 'St John's CofE Foundation Middle School' -- is a middle school located in the town of Bromsgrove, Worcestershire. As of 2017, St John's have 648 students on roll, all aged between 9 and 13.  In 2020 that figure was recorded as 640.

Pupils from St John's Middle School tend to feed into either South Bromsgrove High School or North Bromsgrove High School. In the latest Ofsted report in 2012, St John's was awarded 'Outstanding' status.

References

External links
 

Middle schools in Worcestershire
Academies in Worcestershire